TM Benidorm is a team of handball based in Benidorm, Spain. It plays in Liga ASOBAL.

History

The current club was founded in 1994. In May 2014, they were promoted to Liga ASOBAL, in which the team has been playing ever since. In 2020, the team played in the final of the Copa del Rey, and in 2021 they also reached the final of the Supercopa ASOBAL. Internationally, the team played in the 2020/21 EHF European League.

Crest, colours, supporters

Kits

Management

Team

Current squad 

Squad for the 2022–23 season

Technical staff
 Head Coach:  Fernando Latorre
 Fitness Coach:  Sergio Carballeira

Transfers

Transfers for the 2022–23 season

Joining 
  Rolandas Bernatonis (LB) from  SBS-Eger
  Ramiro Martínez (RW) from  Balonmano Sinfín
  Ruben Filipe Santos (CB) from  Vitória Setubal
  Mladen Šotić (LW) from  RK Vojvodina
  Dragan Soljic (LP) from  CB Ademar León
  Samuel Ibáñez (GK) from  BM Ciudad Encantada

Leaving 
  Álvaro Ruiz Sánchez (CB) (retires)
  Nacho Vallés (CB) to  KS Azoty-Puławy
  James Parker (LB) to  Zamalek SC Handball
  Joaquín Barceló (RW) to  BM Villa de Aranda
  Roney Franzini (GK) to  BM Cisne
  Pedro Martínez (LP) to  BM Atlético Valladolid
  José Oliver (LP)

Previous Squads

EHF ranking

Former club members

Notable former players

  Álvaro Cabanas (2018-2020)
  David Cuartero Sánchez (2014–2018)
  Josep Folqués (2015–2016, 2019–2021)
  Rubén Marchán (2015-2019)
  Álvaro Ruiz Sánchez (2021–2022)
  Ramiro Martínez (2022-)
  James Parker (2019-2022)
  Pablo Simonet (2016-2020)
  Pablo Vainstein (2021-)
  Leonardo Terçariol (2018-2021)
  Emil Feuchtmann (2020-2021)
  Esteban Salinas (2015-2018)
  Guillermo Corzo (2016–2018)
  Jorge Pabán (2017–2020)
  Gianluca Dapiran (2018-2019)
  Rolandas Bernatonis (2022-)
  Mile Mijušković (2016-2019)
  Darius Makaria (2017-2018)
  Mikhail Revin (2018–2019)
  Ivan Nikčević (2020-)

References

External links
 
 

Spanish handball clubs
Liga ASOBAL teams
Benidorm
Sport in the Valencian Community